The SOE F Section timeline lists the significant events in the history of Section F of the Special Operations Executive.  The Special Operations Executive (SOE) was a clandestine organization of the United Kingdom during World War II. The purpose of SOE was to conduct espionage, sabotage, and reconnaissance in countries occupied by the Axis powers. SOE agents allied themselves with resistance groups and supplied them with weapons and equipment parachuted in from England. Section F was responsible for many of SOE's activities in France which was occupied by Nazi Germany.

SOE F Section sent about 470 agents to France from 1941 to 1944, of whom about 40 were women. The Valençay SOE Memorial lists 91 men and 13 women agents who were killed, executed, or died in concentration camps during the war. SOE agents in France were organized into networks which usually consisted of an organiser (the leader), a courier, and a wireless operator.

1940
19 June
British Prime Minister Winston Churchill wrote a memorandum proposing to create an organization "to coordinate all action by way of subversion and sabotage against the enemy overseas. The army of Nazi Germany was in the process of occupying many countries of Europe, including France which would initially be divided into the Occupied Zone and the unoccupied or "Free Zone." (Vichy France)

22 July
The Special Operations Executive was created with Hugh Dalton, the Minister of Economic Warfare, appointed at its head. Dalton said that Churchill told him to "set Europe ablaze."

1941

April 1941
April
Vera Atkins joined SOE and was appointed the intelligence officer for Section F.  Romanian born, she became "the most powerful personality in SOE."

May 1941
May 
Giliana Balmaceda was the first female SOE agent to be sent to occupied France. A citizen of Chile, she traveled legally to Vichy France and collected documents such as ration and identification cards that could be forged by the SOE for its undercover agents in France.
5 May
Wireless operator Georges Bégué was the first male SOE F section agent in France and the first to arrive by parachute. He landed in Indre Department. He set up radio communications and met agents who followed him.

June 1941
13 June
The first airdrop of weapons to the French Resistance took place, arranged by Georges Bégue and Pierre de Vomécourt. Two CLE Canisters were parachuted onto the estate of Philippe de Vomécourt near Limoges. The Vomécourt brothers created the first two SOE networks (or reseau) in France, named Autogiro and Ventriloquist.

August 1941
23 August
American Virginia Hall departed England for Vichy France as a SOE agent. Her cover was as a correspondent for The New York Post. The United States was not yet at war with Germany and Americans could travel to and from France. Hall was the first female SOE agent to live and work in France for an extended period of time.

September 1941
September
Maurice Buckmaster was appointed the leader of SOE F Section. At this time the SOE headquarters staff of Section F consisted of eight people which would be increased to 24 during the next year. Nicolas Bodington became Buckmaster's deputy.

4 September
The first clandestine landing of a Westland Lysander airplane in support of SOE took place on a farm field in Indre Department. The Lysander transported agents and reports back and forth from England to France and vice versa. Sixty-three Lysander flights would land in France during the war, transporting 102 agents into France and evacuating 129. Some agents arrived or departed by Lockheed Hudson airplane. Most arrived by parachute.  

6/7 September
SOE agents Benjamin Cowburn, Michael Trotobas, Victor Gerson, George Langelaan, Jean du Puy, and André Bloch parachuted into France at night near Châteauroux. They were met by Bégué, Max Hymans, and a local farmer, Octave Chanteraine. Cowburn, Trotobas, and Gerson would become important SOE agents.

19/20 September
SOE agent Francis Basin arrived in France by clandestine boat and set up operations in Cannes on the French Riviera.  He came into contact with an organization called Carte headed by an artist named André Girard who claimed to have organized a large group of resisters to German control. Basin's reports on Carte gave SOE hope that it could be used as the spearhead of a large resistance movement to the Germans.

October 1941
20 October
In what was called the "mousetrap," Vichy Police learned of a Marseilles safehouse called the Villa des Bois and arrested about 10 SOE agents who visited the Villa.

24 October
As part of the "mousetrap," Georges Bégué was arrested in Marseilles and in an unrelated action, a routine document check, Michael Trotabas was arrested in Chateauroux. The arrests left Virginia Hall in Lyon as nearly the only SOE agent remaining at large in Vichy France and she had no wireless operator for communication with SOE headquarters.

November 1941
17 November
In Paris Nazi spy catcher Sergeant Hugo Bleicher led German police in arresting members of a Franco-Polish resistance group, Interallié. Among those arrested was Mathilde Carré, nicknamed "the Cat." In exchange for money and freedom, Carré agreed to work for Bleicher and helped him arrest additional members of the group. Interallié was destroyed.

December 1941
26 December
His wireless operator having been arrested, Pierre de Vomécourt had no means of communicating with SOE headquarters in London. In Paris he was introduced to Mathilde Carré who, unknown to him, had become a double agent, working for the Germans.  She told him she had access to a wireless. The wireless was controlled by the Germans and they began transmitting, receiving, and reading Vomécourt's messages.

1942

January 1942
9/10 January
Peter Churchill landed by submarine at Miramar on the French Riviera, to evaluate the Carte network. Carte's leader, André Girard, claimed that his organization could, with SOE help, undertake sabotage and guerilla warfare and eventually field an army of 300,000 men to resist German control of France. Assistance to Carte became F Section's top priority in 1942.

February 1942
26/27 February
Pierre de Vomécourt and Mathilde Carré departed France by Royal Navy motor torpedo boat to return to England. De Vomécourt had realized she was a German agent and persuaded her to go to England with him.  She gained the approval of her German handlers for the trip, because she would learn much about SOE and report to them upon her return to France. Instead, Carré was imprisoned in England for the remainder of the war.

April 1942
25 April
Pierre de Vomécourt was arrested by Hugo Bleicher in Paris. He had been parachuted back into France on 1 April. Vomécourt persuaded the Germans to treat him and his followers as prisoners of war, rather than spies, and he spent the rest of the war imprisoned in Colditz Castle. His arrest, and the destruction of his Autogiro network, left SOE without any working networks in France, although Virginia Hall remained active in Lyon.

July 1942
1/2 July
English painter Brian Stonehouse, a wireless operator, parachuted into occupied France near the city of Tours, Indre-et-Loire, in the Loire Valley. Stonehouse was captured in October 1942 along with courier Blanche Charlet, and spent the rest of the war in German prisons, including Natzweiler-Struthof concentration camp. Charlet later escaped and was evacuated to England.

15 July
Eleven SOE agents, including Michael Trotobas and Georges Bégué, escaped from a French prison in the Dordogne region. They made their way to Lyon where Virginia Hall helped them cross the border into Spain and return to England.

29/30 July
SOE F Section's second on command, Nicolas Bodington, landed on the French Riviera via clandestine boat. Landed with him was Carte's second-in-command, Henri Frager and courier Yvonne Rudellat. Bodington's task was to assess the viability of Carte as a resistance organization and the assistance needed from SOE. Ruddelat would become involved with the Prosper network as a courier and saboteur.

Claude de Baissac parachuted with Harry Peulevé near Nimes. Dropped from too low an altitude, Peulevé broke his leg. Despite a sprained ankle, de Baissac continued with his mission to set up the Scientist Network and to conduct espionage at Bordeaux. After a partial recovery, Puelevé, still limping, walked across the Pyrenees to Spain and returned to England in November.

August 1942
27/28 August
John Starr arrived by parachute in a field near Valence, Drôme, in Vichy France on his first mission. Peter Churchill arrived by parachute near Montpellier on his third mission. His job was to liaison with Carte and his network was called Spindle. Both were highly regarded agents.

September 1942
12 September
Nicolas Bodington returned to England from the French Riviera and presented a favorable report on the Carte network and its potential as a resistance organization. SOE began to plan to provide substantial assistance in money, arms, and supplies to Carte.

17/18 September
Michael Trotobas parachuted back into France, landing near Montargis. Trotobas went to Lille where he organized the Farmer network and led many sabotage missions.

25 September
Andrée Borrel and Lise de Baissac arrived by parachute at night at a field near Mer, Loir-et-Cher (a parachute jump the previous night was aborted due to the signals in the drop zone being incorrect). They were the first SOE female agents to be parachuted into France. Borrel went to Paris to become a key figure in the Prosper network. De Baissac went to Poitiers where, working mostly by herself, she supported several agents and networks.

October 1942
1/2 October
Francis Suttill arrived by parachute near Vendôme and proceeded to Paris to establish the Prosper (also called Physician) network. Suttill was highly regarded by SOE. Prosper was to replace the now defunct Autogiro network as the most important SOE network in northern France. Andrée Borrel was Suttill's courier and his wireless operator was Gilbert Norman.

November 1942

November
Poor security doomed the Carte network. Traveling by train to Paris, André Marsac's briefcase was stolen by a German agent. The briefcase contained the names and personal information about more than 200 Carte supporters. The Germans continued to observe Carte, but did not take immediate action to arrest those on the list.

3/4 November
George Starr and Odette Sansom arrived clandestinely by boat at night near Cannes, Alpes-Maritimes, on the Mediterranean coast of France.  The return voyage carried John Starr out of France following his first mission, taking with him reports collected by Peter Churchill. George Starr would establish a network in southwestern France and Sansom would become Churchill's courier.

8 November
Allied forces invaded French colonies in North Africa and in consequence the Germans and Italians invaded and occupied previously un-occupied Vichy France. The German occupation made life for SOE agents in former Vichy France much more dangerous. However, most of Prosper's operations were in northern, occupied France.

13 November
Phillipe de Vomécourt was arrested by French police near Limoges and sentenced to 10 years in prison.

December 1942
7/12 December
Claude de Baissac organized the Scientist network in Bordeaux with the all-important priority of gathering intelligence and carrying out sabotage against the submarine base there. De Baissac's planned sabotage was thwarted when British commandos simultaneously (without coordination within the British government) carried out Operation Frankton against the submarine base. Frankton was only partially successful, German security increased afterwards and sabotage by de Baissac became infeasible.

29/30 December
Jack Agazarian parachuted into France to join the Prosper Network as a second wireless operator. He was later joined by his wife Francine, a courier. They were one of only a few married couples working for SOE, but, although they both worked for Prosper, they had different jobs.

1943

January 1943
 2 January
The Carte network was riven by internal controversy and finally split into factions headed by André Girard and Henri Frager. Peter Churchill, who was the liaison of Carte with SOE, favored Frager. 

22 January
Henri Déricourt, a pilot, parachuted into France and went to Paris to work as the air movements officer for the Prosper and other networks. Based in Paris, Déricourt organized Lysander landings at clandestine air fields. Prior to World War II, Déricourt was friends with SOE Deputy Director Nicolas Bodington who became SOE's Deputy Director and Karl Boemelburg who became the German Sicherheitsdienst (the SD, the SS security service) director in Paris.

March 1943

23/24 March
Peter Churchill and Henri Frager of Carte returned to England for consultations with SOE by Lysander flight from near Compiègne.  On the inward flight Francis Cammaerts arrived to take Churchill's place and was driven to Paris.

25 March
The German destruction of Carte commenced with the arrest of André Marsac in Paris which was followed by additional arrests.  Francis Cammaerts, recently arrived, was appalled at the loose security of Carte and departed Paris for Annecy.

April 1943
16 April
One day after Peter Churchill returned to France, he and his courier, Odette Sansom, were arrested by Hugo Bleicher in Saint-Jorioz near Annecy. Bleicher learned their location from arrested Carte members André Marsac and Roger Bardet. The Carte network in which SOE had invested so much hope was destroyed. The Prosper network of Francis Suttill became SOE's principal effort to foster resistance to the German occupation. Prosper was based in Paris. Churchill and Sansom would both survive the war in concentration camps.

18 April
With contacts from the ruins of the Interallié, Autogiro and Carte networks, Prosper had grown rapidly and its writ now extended "from the Ardennes to the Atlantic." However, in a first sign of worry, Prosper leader Francis Suttill sent a report to SOE saying that he distrusted former Carte official Henri Frager, now associated with Prosper.

22 April
The destruction of the Prosper network began with the arrest by the German SD of sisters Germaine and Madeleine Tambour in Paris. Both had been associated with Carte and also with Prosper. Francis Suttill attempted unsuccessfully to bribe the Germans for their release. Both were later executed.  The sisters' apartment was a safe house and a letter box to pass along messages for SOE agents. A few days before the arrest, Benjamin Cowburn had commented to Suttill that too many people were going in and out of the apartment.

May 1943
20/21 May
Francis Suttill returned to France after a week of consultations with SOE in London. He informed SOE that he believed the Germans had infiltrated the Prosper network because of the large number of arrests taking place. His mood was described as "jaded," a "show of nerves," and antagonistic about what he considered the failings of SOE headquarters.

June 1943
15/16 June
Noor Inayat Khan, Diana Rowden, and Cecily Lefort arrived by air at a location north-east of Angers, Maine-et-Loire, in the Loire Valley, where they were met by Henri Déricourt. Inayat Khan would work with the Prosper network in Paris. Jack Agazarian left on the return flight to England. Agazarian had been accused by Suttill of being careless.

19/20 June
Canadian SOE agents Frank Pickersgill and John Kenneth Macalister had parachuted into France a few days earlier. They were met by Yvonne Rudelatt and Pierra Culioli, who were to drive them to Paris, but the two Canadians were taken into custody by the Germans in Dhuizon.  After a car chase Rudelatt and Culioli were wounded and captured.

23 June
Andrée Borrel and Gilbert Norman, two of the three central figures of the Prosper network, were arrested by the  Germans in Paris. Later that same day their leader Francis Suttill was arrested in a small hotel in Paris.  Only Borrel and Norman were likely to have known his location.

In London temporarily, Jack Agazarian told SOE that Suttill believed the security of Henri Déricourt's air movements operation was poor. This was apparently the first of many reports by SOE agents expressing concern about Déricourt. Some called him a "traitor" although it was unclear to SOE in London whether that charge pertained to Déricourt (code named "Gilbert") or Suttill's wireless operator, Gilbert Norman.

July 1943
7 July
A wireless message ostensibly from Gilbert Norman in Paris confirmed that Suttill had been arrested.  However, the message did not contain a security check inserted into all messages by operators to confirm their identity and that they were not broadcasting under duress. Rather than question the provenance of the message, SOE commander Buckmaster replied, "You have forgotten your security check. Be more careful." The message had in fact been sent to SOE by the Germans.

Buckmaster's mistake permitted the Germans to play "funkspiel" (radio games) with Norman's wireless, receiving messages from SOE and sending false messages to SOE, a game they would play for the next few months with great success.

18 July
John Starr was wounded and captured by German Sicherheitsdienst (SD) in Dijon. He was tortured before being moved to Paris to SD headquarters at 84 Avenue Foch.

22/23 July
Nicolas Bodington and Jack Agazarian landed in France on a Lockheed Hudson airplane to investigate the fate of the Prosper network. SOE in London was aware that Suttill had been arrested but believed that his wireless operator Gilbert Norman was still at liberty. In reality, Norman was imprisoned and the Germans were using his radio to mislead the SOE.

30 July 
In Paris, Bodington and Agazarian contacted Gilbert Norman to arrange a meeting. The Germans in control of Norman's radio told Bodington to meet Norman at an apartment near the Gare Saint-Lazare. However, instead of Bodington, Agazarian went to the apartment and was arrested by the Germans. Why Bodington did not go to the apartment rather than Agazarian has been disputed. Bodington's friend and double agent Henri Déricourt may have warned Bodington not to go to the rendezvous. Agazarian was later executed.

August 1943
2 August
SOE agent and prominent Grand Prix motor racing driver William Grover-Williams was arrested by the Gestapo. He would later be executed.

17/18 August
Nicolas Bodington, Claude de Baissac, and Lise de Baissac returned to England via Lysander. Claude de Baissac's Scientist network, based in Bordeaux, which had tentacles reaching from the Pyrenees to Paris, had been destroyed as had the Prosper Network.

September 1943
15 September 
Cecily Lefort was arrested by Gestapo in Montélimar, 26, Rhône-Alpes.
18 September
Harry Peulevé, Yolande Beekman and Harry Despaigne arrived by Lysander near Angers.

October 1943
13 October
Noor Inayat Khan, the last remaining SOE wireless operator in the Paris area, was arrested. She apparently was betrayed by another woman to the Germans for money. The Germans also found her codes and security checks and used her wireless to mislead SOE, resulting in the arrest of more SOE agents and recovery of arms. Inayat Khan was imprisoned at 84 Avenue Foch, the SD (German counter-intelligence) headquarters in Paris.

30 October
Vera Leigh was arrested at a café near the Place des Ternes in Paris and taken to Fresnes prison, Val-de-Marne.

November 1943
18 November
Diana Rowden and John Young were arrested at Clairvaux-les-Lacs, 39 near Lons-le-Saunier.
19 November
Diana Rowden was taken to 84 Avenue Foch where she was interrogated for two weeks before being taken to Fresnes prison, 94.
25 November
Noor Inyat Khan, John Starr and Colonel Léon Faye escaped from 84 Avenue Foch but were quickly captured in the immediate vicinity.
26 November
Noor Inyat Khan and Leon Faye were sent to Germany after refusing to take an oath not to try to escape again. John Starr took the oath. 
 27 November
Michael Trotobas was killed in a gunfight with German soldiers in Lille.

1944

January 1944
3 January
In a jailbreak from Elysses prison, Philippe de Vomécourt and 52 other resistors escaped.  Vomécourt made his way to Spain and to England and later in 1944 back to France where he led several sabotage operations.

13 January
Yolande Beekman and Gustave Bieler were arrested at the Café Moulin Brulé in Paris.

February 1944
28/29 February
SOE agents Madeleine Damerment, France Antelme and Lionel Lee took off from RAF Tempsford airfield in a No. 161 Squadron Halifax aircraft late on 28 February and parachuted into a field near Chartres, Eure-et-Loir, early the next morning and were arrested by waiting Gestapo. The Germans knew of their arrival due to the wireless machines they had captured during the destruction of the Prosper network. These three were among the 19 SOE agents captured on their arrival in France and executed. French helpers of the Prosper network who were deported to Germany totaled at least 167.

March 1944
2-3 March
Eileen Nearne landed near Les Lagneys, Indre.

21 March
Harry Peulevé and Louis Bertheau were arrested in Brive-la-Gaillarde.

April 1944
April
Maurice Southgate was arrested.
April 5
Lilian Rolfe was dropped near the city of Orléans, 45, to work with the "Historian" network run by George Wilkinson
April 29
John Hind Farmer and Nancy Wake of the "Freelance" network parachuted into Auvergne to liaise between London and the local Maquis.

May 1944
May 13
Vera Leigh, Andrée Borrel, Odette Sansom, Diana Rowden, Yolande Beekman, Eliane Plewman and Madeleine Damerment  were taken from Fresnes prison, 94, to 84 Avenue Foch, where they were joined by Sonya Olschanezky.  They were all then moved to the civil prison at Karlsruhe in Germany.

May 24

1st Lt. Lee G. Johnson was captured by the Gestapo in Paris, France.  He remained there until September, 1944.  From there he was transferred to Stalag Luft I, Barth, Germany.  He remained there until its April 1945 liberation.

June 1944
June 6
 The D-Day landings occurred in Normandy.

July 1944
July
Eileen Nearne arrested.
July 2
Henri Frager was arrested by Abwehr sergeant Hugo Bleicher at a rendezvous arranged by Roger Bardet.
July 6
Diana Rowden, Vera Leigh, Sonya Olschanezky, and Andrée Borrel were shipped to the Natzweiler-Struthof, Bas-Rhin, concentration camp in the Vosges Mountains of Alsace (France) where they were injected with phenol and disposed of in the crematorium. Their arrival at the camp was witnessed by Brian Stonehouse. 

Christine Granville arrived by parachute in France, joining the Jockey network led by Francis Cammaerts.

July 31
Lilian Rolfe was arrested in Nargis, 45 and taken to Fresnes prison, 94.

August 1944
August
Lilian Rolfe was shipped to Ravensbrück concentration camp.
John Starr was sent to Sachsenhausen concentration camp.
8 August
Harry Peulevé, Maurice Southgate, Denis Barrett, Robert Benoist, Pierre Culioli, Angehand Defendini, Henri Frager, Frank Pickersgill, James Mayer, Roméo Sabourin, Arthur Steele and George Alfred "Teddy" Wilkinson were sent to Neue Bremm transit camp at Saarbrücken.
16 August
Harry Peulevé, [Maurice Southgate, Eliseé Allard, Denis Barrett, Robert Benoist, Jean Bouguennec, Pierre Culioli, Angehand Defendini, Julien Detal, Henri Frager, Emile-Henri Garry, Frank Pickersgill, Pierre Geelen, Marcel Leccia, John Macalister, James Mayer, Pierre Mulsant, Charles Rechenmann, Roméo Sabourin, Arthur Steele and George Wilkinson arrived at Buchenwald concentration camp.
17 August
SOE Agent Christine Granville bribed the Gestapo for the release from prison of SOE Agents Francis Cammaerts and Xan Fielding who had been arrested earlier in August and were to be executed. Granville's feat was later portrayed fictionally in the television series Wish Me Luck.
25 August
General von Choltitz the German Military Commandant in Paris, formally signed an Act of Surrender to the Provisional Government of the French Republic, although some German strongholds remained in the city.
27 August
John Kenneth Macalister, Frank Pickersgill and Roméo Sabourin, were shipped to Buchenwald concentration camp.

September 1944
6 September 6
Gilbert Norman was executed at Mauthausen concentration camp
13 September
Yolande Beekman, Madeleine Damerment, Noor Inayat Khan, and Eliane Plewman were executed, each by a single shot to the head, and their bodies cremated at Dachau concentration camp.
14 September 
Eliseé Allard, Robert Benoist, Jean Bouguennec, Angehand Defendini, Julien Detal, Emile-Henri Garry, Frank Pickersgill, Pierre Geelen, Marcel Leccia, John Macalister, James Mayer, Charles Rechenmann, Roméo Sabourin and Arthur Steele were executed at Buchenwald concentration camp.

October 1944
5 October
 Denis Barrett, Henri Frager, Pierre Mulsant and George Alfred Wilkinson were executed at Buchenwald concentration camp.

1945

February 1945
February 5
Lilian Rolfe was executed and her body disposed of in the crematorium at Ravensbrück concentration camp.
February 17
John Starr was sent to Mauthausen concentration camp.

February
Violette Szabo taken from her cell in Ravensbrück concentration camp and shot in the back of the neck.

March 1945

29 March

Jack Agazarian was executed at Flossenbürg concentration camp. Just prior to his execution Agazarian tapped out in Morse code on the wall of his cell a message to his wife. The Danish prisoner who received the message later delivered it to SOE and Agazarian's wife.

April 1945
April 11
Harry Peulevé escaped from Schönebeck concentration camp.

April 29
 Brian Stonehouse was liberated from Dachau concentration camp by American troops.

May 1945
May 4
 Peter Churchill was liberated in Austria by American troops.
May 7
Nazi Germany surrendered to the Allies.

1946
15 January
SOE was officially dissolved.

Notes

Groups of World War II
Espionage
Special Operations Executive
Chronology of World War II
United Kingdom intelligence community